"Lost You Anyway" is a song co-written and recorded by American country music artist Toby Keith.  It was released in March 2009 as the third and final single from his album That Don't Make Me a Bad Guy.  The song peaked at number 10 on the US Billboard Hot Country Songs chart. Keith wrote this song with Bobby Pinson.

Content
"Lost You Anyway" is a ballad in which the male narrator looks back on a failed relationship. He lists off various things that he could have done in attempts to keep his lover from leaving, but then says that he probably would have "lost [her] anyway".

Critical reception
Dan Milliken of Country Universe gave the song a C− rating. He said that the lyrics were largely uninspired, but added that the production was solid, and that Keith's vocals were strong. Jonathan Keefe of Slant magazine critic Jonathan Keefe said that although Keith's masculine image tended to make his ballads sound insincere, "Lost You Anyway" was still a better-constructed song in comparison to other similar songs on country radio.

Chart performance

Year-end charts

References

2009 singles
Toby Keith songs
Songs written by Toby Keith
Songs written by Bobby Pinson
Show Dog-Universal Music singles
2008 songs